Frank Christian may refer to:

 Frank Christian (trumpeter) (1887–1973), American jazz trumpeter
 Frank Christian (singer-songwriter) (1952–2012), American singer-songwriter
 Frank Christian (NASCAR owner) (1910–1969), American NASCAR race car owner
 Frank Christian (politician) (1911–1988), Canadian Member of Parliament
 Frank LaMar Christian (1876–1955), warden of Elmira Correctional Facility

See also
Francis Joseph Christian (born 1942), American bishop